Rocquigny-Equancourt Road British Cemetery is a war grave for mainly Commonwealth soldiers who died in the First World War. It was designed by Sir Reginald Blomfield in the 1920s and contains the bodies of 2,046 people: 1,817 identified Commonwealth casualties plus 21 unidentified casualties; also 198 German casualties and 10 French civilians.

Among the burials are Victoria Cross recipient John Harold Rhodes, Edward Horner, a member of a prominent British aristocratic family, and Archie McMillan Scottish professional footballer.

The cemetery lies in countryside east of Amiens in the Somme department  of France between Rocquigny and Équancourt.

References

External links
 Photos of the cemetery
 Photos and plan
 

Cemeteries in Somme (department)
Commonwealth War Graves Commission cemeteries in France
World War I cemeteries in France